Sommerfeldt is a surname. Notable people with the surname include:

Christian Sommerfeldt (1746–1811), Norwegian geographer and civil servant
Einar Sommerfeldt (1889–1976), Norwegian rower
Gunnar Sommerfeldt (1890–1947), Danish actor and film director
Hakon Adelsteen Sommerfeldt (1811–1888), Norwegian naval officer and ship designer 
Harald Sommerfeldt (1886–1966), Norwegian businessman
René Sommerfeldt (born 1974), German cross-country skier
Wilhelm Preus Sommerfeldt (1881–1957), Norwegian bibliographer and librarian

See also
Sommerfeld

Norwegian-language surnames